Find You may refer to:

"Find You" (Zedd song), 2014
"Find You" (Nick Jonas song), 2017